The Waterloo Bucks are a baseball team that plays in the Northwoods League, a collegiate summer baseball league. Their home games are played at the Riverfront Stadium in Waterloo, Iowa. They were founded in 1995. They originally played in the South Division, but switched to the North Division in 2010.

On September 29, 2014, The Cedar Rapids Ball Club, Inc. announced that they had officially purchased and taken over operations of the team. The Cedar Rapids Ball Club, Inc. is also the owner of Cedar Rapids Kernels.

References

External links
 Waterloo Bucks - official site
 Northwoods League - official site

Northwoods League teams
Amateur baseball teams in Iowa
Waterloo, Iowa